The Calgary Society of Independent Filmmakers was formed in 1978 and is operated on a non-profit basis out of Calgary, Alberta in Canada.  Four decades ago, twelve local filmmakers and artists collaborated to form the Society of Filmmakers in response to a growing interest in film production and need for equipment and resources.  The organization is commonly known by its members as CSIF.

25th anniversary
In 2003, the Society celebrated its 25th anniversary. Many local filmmakers got their start in the 70s and 80s taking classes and are now working in the industry including producers Wendy Hill-Tout, Gary Burns and directors Mike Dowse, Robert Cuffley and David Winning.

References

External links
Official Website

Organizations based in Calgary
Film organizations in Canada